In Greek mythology, Caunus or Kaunos was a son of Miletus, grandson of Apollo and brother of Byblis.

Mythology 
Caunus became the object of his own sister's passionate love. From some accounts it appears that Caunus was the first to develop the affection towards her; others describe Byblis' feelings as unrequited. All sources agree, however, that Caunus chose to flee from home in order to prevent himself from actually committing incest with Byblis, and that she followed him until she was completely exhausted by grief and died (or committed suicide).

Caunus eventually came to Lycia, where he married the Naiad Pronoe and had by her a son Aegialus. Caunus became king of the land; when he died, Aegialus gathered all the people from scattered settlements in a newly founded city which he named Caunus after his father.

Notes

References 

 Antoninus Liberalis, The Metamorphoses of Antoninus Liberalis translated by Francis Celoria (Routledge 1992). Online version at the Topos Text Project.
 Conon, Fifty Narrations, surviving as one-paragraph summaries in the Bibliotheca (Library) of Photius, Patriarch of Constantinople translated from the Greek by Brady Kiesling. Online version at the Topos Text Project.
 Parthenius, Love Romances translated by Sir Stephen Gaselee (1882-1943), S. Loeb Classical Library Volume 69. Cambridge, MA. Harvard University Press. 1916.  Online version at the Topos Text Project.
 Parthenius, Erotici Scriptores Graeci, Vol. 1. Rudolf Hercher. in aedibus B. G. Teubneri. Leipzig. 1858. Greek text available at the Perseus Digital Library.
 Publius Ovidius Naso, Metamorphoses translated by Brookes More (1859-1942). Boston, Cornhill Publishing Co. 1922. Online version at the Perseus Digital Library.
 Publius Ovidius Naso, Metamorphoses. Hugo Magnus. Gotha (Germany). Friedr. Andr. Perthes. 1892. Latin text available at the Perseus Digital Library.

Metamorphoses characters

Characters in Greek mythology
Incest in Greek mythology